The  is Toyota's first production sports car. The prototype for the Sports 800, called the Publica Sports, debuted at the 1962 Tokyo Auto Show, featuring a space age sliding canopy and utilizing the  powertrain of the Publica 700, a Japanese market economy car. The Toyota Sports 800 is affectionately called the "Yota-Hachi" (ヨタハチ), which is a Japanese short form for "Toyota 8". In Japan, the vehicle was exclusive to Toyota Japan retail sales channel called Toyota Publica Store alongside the Publica.

History 
Production started after the introduction of Honda's first car, called the Honda S500, and joined the market segment that was already represented by the Datsun Fairlady, and the Daihatsu Compagno.

The car had aerodynamic styling by Shozo Sato, a designer on loan from Datsun, and Toyota engineer Tatsuo Hasegawa. Hasegawa had been an aircraft designer in World War II and the resulting Sports 800 was a lightweight and agile machine. The Sports 800 was one of the first production cars featuring a lift-out roof panel, or targa top, pre-dating the Porsche Targa. The aluminum targa top could be stored in the trunk, when not in use.

Between 1965 and 1969 approximately 3,131 units were built by Toyota subcontractor Kanto Auto Works. Only about 10% of those vehicles are known to have survived, most being in Japan.

Production tables show 1,235 cars manufactured in 1965, 703 in 1966, 538 in 1967, 440 in 1968, and 215 in 1969.

The vast majority of the 3,131 cars were right hand drive, but some 300 were left hand drive models, built primarily for the Okinawa market (Okinawa, having been American occupied, drove on the right side of the road instead of the left like the rest of Japan). A very limited number of left hand drive cars were used by Toyota to "test drive" in the US, but the American dealerships decided the 800 would not sell well in the US and made a decision not to import or sell the cars in the US market. Toyota let these dealers keep the original batch of around 40 Sports 800s in the US instead of having them shipped back to Japan.

There are subtle design differences between the years. Noticeable differences have included: change over from non-synchro to synchro first gear in 1967; a grill and bumperette change in 1968; and side marker lights in 1969. The basic body design, however, remained unchanged.

An air-cooled 790 cc horizontally opposed two-cylinder boxer engine powered the vehicle. The 0.8 liter 2U (45 PS at 5,400 rpm) was produced from 1965 through 1969, while a similar 2U-B was produced from 1966 through 1976 (in 1975 the Dyna Coaster Bus manual shows that Toyota used the 2U-B as a separate auxiliary engine, just to run the air conditioning unit for the bus). In a less tuned form, the 2U was also used in the Publica (UP20/UP26) and MiniAce (UP100).

Weight was kept down by using aluminum on selected body panels and thin steel on the unibody construction. For the first few years of production even the seat frames were made of aluminum.

Toyota produced a one-off prototype Sports 800 Gas Turbine Hybrid for the 1979 Tokyo Motor Show. The body of the Sports 800 also served as basis of the Sports EV and Sports EV Twin electric concept cars, both unveiled in 2010.

See also 
 Toyota Publica Sports
 Toyota Publica

References

Bibliography

External links 

 North American Owner's Registry
 Japanese Owner's Registry
 Yahoo Groups Toyota 700 and 800 Publica and Sports 800 Group
 Japanese Club Page
 Yotahachi North American Resource Page
 Original S800/UP15 Sales Brochure

Cars introduced in 1965
Cars powered by 2-cylinder engines
Cars powered by boxer engines
Coupés
Rear-wheel-drive vehicles
Roadsters
Sports 800